Bolshiye Kusty is a rural locality (a selo) and the administrative center of Bolshekustovskoye Rural Settlement, Kuyedinsky District, Perm Krai, Russia. The population was 723 as of 2010. There are 7 streets.

Geography 
Bolshiye Kusty is located 49 km northwest of Kuyeda (the district's administrative centre) by road. Kashka is the nearest rural locality.

References 

Rural localities in Kuyedinsky District